Inka Pirqa or Inkapirqa (Quechua Inka Inca, pirqa (Kichwa pirka) wall, "Inca wall", Hispanicized spelling Incaperca) is a  mountain in the Andes of Peru. It is located in the Cusco Region, Canchis Province, on the border of the districts of Combapata and San Pablo.

References

Mountains of Peru
Mountains of Cusco Region